Protopiophila is a genus of cheese skippers (insects in the family Piophilidae). There are eleven described species in Protopiophila.

Species
These species belong to the genus Protopiophila:
 Protopiophila aethiopica (Hennig, 1951)
 Protopiophila atrichosa J. McAlpine, 1977
 Protopiophila australis Harrison, 1960 i g
 Protopiophila contecta (Walker, 1960)
 Protopiophila latipes (Meigen, 1838) i b
 Protopiophila leucodactyla (Hennig, 1954)
 Protopiophila litigata Bonduriansky, 1995
 Protopiophila nigriventris (Curran, 1934)
 Protopiophila pallida J. McAlpine, 1977
 Protopiophila scutellata Harrison, 1960
 Protopiophila vitrea D. McAlpine, 1989
Data sources: i = ITIS, c = Catalogue of Life, g = GBIF, b = Bugguide.net

References

Further reading

 

Piophilidae
Articles created by Qbugbot
Tephritoidea genera